Hamad Ali Hamad (born 27 November 1964) is a Tanzanian CUF politician and Member of Parliament for Magogoni constituency since 2010.

References

Living people
1964 births
Civic United Front MPs
Tanzanian MPs 2010–2015
Mchangamdogo Secondary School alumni
Zanzibari politicians